The 1996–97 National Professional Soccer League season was the thirteenth season for the league.

League standings

American Conference

East Division

Central Division

National Conference

North Division

Midwest Division

Playoffs

Scoring leaders

GP = Games Played, G = Goals, A = Assists, Pts = Points

League awards
 Most Valuable Player: Hector Marinaro, Cleveland                          
 Defender of the Year: Daryl Doran, St. Louis
 Rookie of the Year: Jason Dunn, Wichita
 Goalkeeper of the Year: Victor Nogueira, Milwaukee
 Coach of the Year: Ross Ongaro, Edmonton
 Finals MVP: Warren Westcoat, Kansas City

All-NPSL Teams

All-NPSL Rookie Teams

References
Major Indoor Soccer League II (RSSSF)

1996 in American soccer leagues
1997 in American soccer leagues
1996 in Canadian soccer
1997 in Canadian soccer
1996-97